Hilton High School is part of the 4,450-student Hilton Central School District, a public school system based in Hilton, a suburb of Rochester, New York.  Hilton High School offers an International Baccalaureate Diploma, and the school has made Newsweek 's Top 1,200 schools in the United States each year since ranking at number 989 in 2005. Hilton has a high graduation rate of 92% (2017–18) and is top 200 in New York state and eighth of approximately 20 schools in Monroe County.

Achievements
The first Hilton Schools Regents Diploma student, Jennie Mitchell, graduated in 1899. More than 20 one-room schoolhouses and the "Henry Street School" were centralized in 1949.

Sports
In March 2005, Hilton added, as a part of their Capital Bond Project, an Aquatic Center at Merton Williams Middle School, replacing the old five-lane pool. This eight-lane pool with an attached diving well and two diving boards includes bleachers for 240 spectators, and an electronic scoreboard.

The Cadets football team are perennial contenders for sectional titles.

Hilton won the 2008 Monroe Community College High School Engineering Competition in the SumoBot competition, claiming the top 4 places.

In 2005, the Hilton Girls' Cross Country Team won the 2005 Nike Team Nationals Race, making them the number one girls' cross country team in the nation.

In 2014, the Hilton Cadets Wrestling Team won the Section V Class AA tournament and finished the season ranked fourth in New York State.

Music
The school runs marching band, concert band, symphonic band, jazz ensemble and wind ensemble. The school's Winter Drum Line is a member of the New York State Percussion Circuit, and competes at membership tournaments throughout Western New York, including a competition hosted each winter at Hilton High School. The Drumline has won the NYS championship competition 15 times, with their most recent victory in 2018. In 2013, performing their show "Arabian Nights: Legend of Scheherazade", Hilton High School was crowned WGI World Champion in Percussion Scholastic "A" class.

Vocally, students participate in da Capo singers, men's chorus, women's chorus, and chorale. Each year the high school produces a musical.

Notable alumni
 Ryan Callahan, former National Hockey League player
 Yianni Diakomihalis, four-time NCAA Wrestling Champion at Cornell University, US Open Champion, 2022 UWW World Silver Medalist
 Josh Jensen, member of the New York State Assembly
 Roy Knyrim, film director and special effects makeup artist

See also
Hilton, New York
Hilton Central School District

References

External links
 

High schools in Monroe County, New York
Public high schools in New York (state)